Caquetaia kraussii is a species of fish endemic to the basin of the Atrato, Cauca, Magdalena, as well as the basin of Lake Maracaibo. The fish has been introduced to the Orinoco River basin. The specific name honours the German naturalist Christian F. F. Krauss (1812-1890) who was director of the Royal Natural History Cabinet in Stuttgart.

Biology

Prefers swamps and marshes with abundant aquatic plants, but also found in rivers. Eats other fish and benthic invertebrates.

References

kraussii
Cichlid fish of South America
Freshwater fish of Colombia
Fish of Venezuela
Taxa named by Franz Steindachner
Fish described in 1878